Carrara marble, Luna marble to the Romans, is a type of white or blue-grey marble popular for use in sculpture and building decor. It has been quarried since Roman times in the mountains just outside the city of Carrara in the province of Massa and Carrara in the Lunigiana, the northernmost tip of modern-day Tuscany, Italy.

More marble has been extracted from the over 650 quarry sites near Carrara than from any other place. The pure white statuario grade was used for monumental sculpture, as "it has a high tensile strength, can take a high gloss polish and holds very fine detail". By the late 20th century this had now run out, and the considerable ongoing production is of stone with a greyish tint, or streaks of black or grey on white. This is still attractive as an architectural facing, or for tiles.

History
Carrara marble has been used since the time of Ancient Rome then called the "Luna marble". 

In the Middle Ages, most of the quarries were owned by the Marquis Malaspina who in turn rented them to families of Carrara masters who managed both the extraction and transport of the precious material. Some of them, such as the Maffioli, who rented some quarries north of Carrara, in the Torano area, or, around 1490, Giovanni Pietro Buffa, who bought marble on credit from local quarrymen and then resold it on the Venetian market, were able to create a dense commercial network, exporting the marble even to distant locations. Just to cite an example, starting from 1474, first the Maffioli, then the Buffa, supplied the marble for the facade of the Certosa di Pavia, also taking care of the transport of the material which, by ship, after having circumnavigated Italy, reached the construction site of the monastery after having sailed up the Po and the Ticino by boat. Starting from the 16th century, Genoese stonecutters-merchants also entered this flourishing trade.

In the 17th and 18th centuries, the marble quarries were monitored by the Cybo and Malaspina families who ruled over Massa and Carrara. The family created the "Office of Marble" in 1564 to regulate the marble mining industry. The city of Massa, in particular, saw much of its plan redesigned (new roads, plazas, intersections, pavings) in order to make it worthy of an Italian country's capital. Following the extinction of the Cybo-Malaspina family, the state was ruled by the House of Austria and management of the mines rested with them. The Basilica of Massa is built entirely of Carrara marble and the old Ducal Palace of Massa was used to showcase the stone.

By the end of the 19th century, Carrara had become a cradle of anarchism in Italy, in particular among the quarry workers. According to a New York Times article of 1894, workers in the marble quarries were among the most neglected labourers in Italy. Many of them were ex-convicts or fugitives from justice. The work at the quarries was so tough and arduous that almost any aspirant worker with sufficient muscle and endurance was employed, regardless of their background.

The quarry workers and stone carvers had radical beliefs that set them apart from others. Anarchism and general radicalism became part of the heritage of the stone carvers. Many violent revolutionists who had been expelled from Belgium and Switzerland went to Carrara in 1885 and founded the first anarchist group in Italy. In Carrara, the anarchist Galileo Palla remarked, “even the stones are anarchists.” The quarry workers were the main actors of the Lunigiana revolt in January 1894.

Quarries

The Apuan Alps above Carrara show evidence of at least 650 quarry sites, with about half of them currently abandoned or worked out. The Carrara quarries have produced more marble than any other place on earth.

Working the quarries is and has always been dangerous. In September 1911, a collapsing cliff face at the Bettogli Quarry crushed 10 workers who were on lunch break under a precipice. A 2014 video made at a Carrara quarry shows workers with missing fingers, and workers performing hazardous, painfully noisy work who are not wearing protective gear of any kind.

The prize yield from Carrara quarries through millennia has been statuario, a pure white marble (coloring in other marbles arises from intermixture with other minerals present in the limestone as it is converted to marble by heat or pressure). However, by the end of the 20th century, the known deposits of Statuario near Carrara are played out. The quarries continue to remove and ship up to a million tons/year of less-esteemed marble, mostly for export. This is mostly streaked with black or grey.

Bianco Carrara classified in C and CD variations as well as Bianco Venatino and Statuarietto are by far the most common types with more expensive exotic variations such as Calacatta Gold, Calacatta Borghini, Calacatta Macchia Vecchia, Arabescato Cervaiole and Arabescato Vagli quarried throughout the Carrara area. Bardiglio has more black, and has been used since Roman times for architectural facings and floors.

Notable monuments and buildings

The marble from Carrara was used for some of the most remarkable buildings in Ancient Rome:
Temple of Proserpina – later reused in many buildings in Valletta
The Pantheon
Trajan's Column
Column of Marcus Aurelius
It was also used in many sculptures of the Renaissance including Michelangelo's David (1501–1504) whilst the statue to Robert Burns, which commands a central position in Dumfries, was carved in Carrara by Italian craftsmen working to Amelia Robertson Hill's model. It was unveiled by future UK Prime Minister Archibald Primrose, 5th Earl of Rosebery on 6 April 1882. Other notable occurrences include:
Marble Arch, London
Victoria Memorial, London
Some sections of the Palace of the Marqués de Dos Aguas, Valencia, Spain
Prem Mandir, Vrindavan, Uttar Pradesh, India
Duomo di Siena, Siena, Italy
Sarcophagus of St. Hedwig, Queen of Poland, Cracow, Poland
Manila Cathedral (interior), Manila, Philippines
First Canadian Place, Toronto, Ontario, Canada 
Sheikh Zayed Mosque, Abu Dhabi, UAE
Harvard Medical School buildings, Boston, Massachusetts, US
Oslo Opera House, Oslo, Norway
Normandy American Cemetery and Memorial (Crosses and Stars of David), Normandy, France
Peace Monument, Washington, DC, US
King Edward VII Memorial, Birmingham, UK
Akshardham, Delhi, India
Aon Center (Chicago) Chicago, Illinois, US
Milwaukee Art Museum, Milwaukee, Wisconsin, US
Robba Fountain, Ljubljana, Slovenia
Finlandia Hall, Helsinki, Finland
Devon Tower, Oklahoma City, Oklahoma, US
The Rotunda (University of Virginia), Charlottesville, Virginia, US
Far Eastern University, Manila, Philippines—Administration Building
The Rome Italy Temple of the Church of Jesus Christ of Latter-day Saints
Glasgow City Chambers, Scotland
General Grant National Memorial (Tomb), New York, New York, US
Winter Garden Atrium, World Financial Center, New York, New York, US

Carrara marble has been designated by the International Union of Geological Sciences as a Global Heritage Stone Resource.

Use in isotopic standard
Calcite, obtained from an 80 kg sample of Carrara marble, is used as the IAEA-603 isotopic standard in mass spectrometry for the calibration of δ18O and δ13C.

Gallery

Degradation
The black yeast Micrococcus halobius can colonize Carrara marble by forming a biofilm and producing gluconic, lactic, pyruvic and succinic acids from glucose, as seen in the Dionysos Theater of the Acropolis in Athens.

See also
No Cav
List of types of marble
Lizza di Piastreta
Marmifera di Carrara railway
Lardo, a culinary specialty of the Carrara region commonly cured in basins made of Carrara marble

Notes

References

"Kings":The Art of Making in Antiquity: Stoneworking in the Roman World, King's College, London, "Material, Luna Marble"

Further reading

External links 
 
 Official Website Calacatta Marble

Marble
Marble
Quarries in Italy